Edmar may refer to:
 Edmar Bernardes, former Brazilian footballer
 Edmar Halovskyi de Lacerda, Brazilian-Ukrainian footballer
 Edmar Japiassú Maia, former Brazilian footballer
 Edmar Lacerda da Silva, Brazilian footballer
 Edmar Victoriano, former Angolan basketball player
 Edmar Mednis, late Latvian-American chess player
 Edmar Castañeda, Colombian harpist
 Edmar Figueira, Brazilian footballer
 Edmar Hermany, Brazilian politician
 Edmar Gomes Rodrigues, former Brazilian footballer
 Ed Marszewski, United States businessman